The Driver is the debut solo album by American country music artist Charles Kelley. It was released on February 5, 2016, via Capitol Records Nashville. The lead single (and title track) was released to radio on October 19, 2015.

Commercial performance
The album debuted on the Top Country Albums at No. 2, and No. 35 on the Billboard 200, selling 14,000 copies in its first week. It sold a further 4,900 copies the following week.  As of June 2016, the album has sold 38,000 copies in the US.

Track listing

Personnel
 Dierks Bentley - vocals on track 2
 Nathan Chapman - harmony vocals
 Chad Cromwell - drums
 Josh Kelley - harmony vocals, acoustic guitar
 Miranda Lambert - harmony vocals on track 8
 Rob McNelley - electric guitar
 Jerry McPherson - electric guitar
 Stevie Nicks - harmony vocals on track 4
 Eric Paslay - vocals and guitar on track 2
 Sari Reist - cello
 Michael Rhodes - bass
 Michael Rojas - keyboards, accordion
 Justin Schipper - pedal steel guitar
 Jimmie Lee Sloas - bass
 Abe Stoklasa - harmony vocals, pedal steel guitar
 Daniel Tashian - electric guitar, harmony vocals
 Mark Trussell - electric guitar
 Biff Watson - acoustic guitar
 Paul Worley - electric guitar
 Craig Young - bass

Chart performance

Album

Weekly charts

Year-end charts

Singles

References

2016 debut albums
Charles Kelley albums
Capitol Records albums
Albums produced by Paul Worley